Veules-les-Roses is a commune in the Seine-Maritime department in the Normandy region in northern France.

Geography

Its water is used to create ponds for growing watercress whence it finds its way to the sea through a gap in the high chalk cliffs, which overlook a sand and pebble beach.

Population

Places of interest
 The church of St. Martin, dating from the thirteenth century.
 A house known as ‘The Old Château' with a dovecote.
 A sixteenth-century presbytery now the Hôtel des Tourelles.
 A monument to Victor Hugo.
 Three restored watermills.
 A seventeenth-century chapel.
 The ruins of the church of St. Nicolas and a sandstone Celtic cross, both dating from the sixteenth century.
 The twelfth-century chapel of Notre-Dame.
 The ship wreck of the Cérons. The ship sank on 12 June 1940 and is visible on the shore at low tide.

People
Many artists have come here to paint, such as Anaïs Aubert, Étienne Mélingue, Henri Harpignies, Paul Meurice, Samuel Peploe and John Duncan Fergusson of the Scottish Colourists school, Ilya Repin and Alexey Bogolyubov of the Russian Peredvizhniki school. Writers include Leroux and Eugène Pierron, Alexandre Dumas fils, Lockroy, José-Maria de Heredia, Henri Rochefort, Alexis Bouvier, Jules Michelet and Victor Hugo, poets Jean Richepin and François Coppée, dramatists Jules Claretie, Henri Lavedan and Émile Bergerat and the composer Alexandre Georges.

Politicians such as Henri Maret, Alexandre Millerand, René Viviani, Louis Malvy, Albert Clemenceau and Pierre Taittinger came here for the sea air. Victor Boucher, Georges Chamarat, Saint-Granier, the writer Maurice Privat, Dominique Bonnaud as well as sports personalities Suzanne Lenglen and Lucien Gaudin.

See also
Communes of the Seine-Maritime department

References

External links

Website of the commune 

Communes of Seine-Maritime
Seaside resorts in France